TheSpeedGamers (also abbreviated as TSG or TSG.TV) is a group of video gamers based out of Arlington, Texas, who raise money for various charities. They accomplish this by streaming live marathons of video games on Twitch (formerly Justin.tv). The group was founded by Britt LaRiviere in early 2008 and still hosts marathons regularly through the year. Viewers can interact with the commentators and other viewers via chat on Twitch. The group has raised over $845,000.00 for more than 20 different charities.

History
Britt LaRiviere founded the group in March 2008.  LaRiviere originally imagined the site as a source for gaming reviews, but over time, the idea evolved into forming a marathon group.  Finally, they decided that if they ran marathons, then they should do it for a worthy cause.  They adopted a Speedrun mentality and ran their first marathon, with a Zelda theme.  Since then, the group has continued on for over nine years, hosting multiple marathons and still going strong .

On January 24, 2014, TheSpeedGamers re-branded themselves as TSG.TV with an ongoing overhaul of their website, forums, and other features. To mark the re-branding, the group did an unannounced 24-hour marathon of Sonic and Mario games, raising money for Mercy Corps.  Donors had the option to apply their donation toward a total for Mario or a total for Sonic.  At the end of the 24 hours, the respective totals were applied as a handicap system for a 40-minute computer-controlled Super Smash Brothers match between Mario and Sonic. The winner of that match would be the franchise for the December 2014 72-hour marathon, raising money for the Rocking H Ranch. Sonic won both the significant majority of the donations and the match, and the December marathon was for the Sonic the Hedgehog franchise.

TSG 24/7 and Streams
Starting in February 2011, TheSpeedGamers started a 24/7 stream. Unlike marathons, no money was being raised. Also unlike marathons, games weren't continually being played. Instead, various music was played while the TheSpeedGamers' fans can chat in the chat room on Justin.tv. For a couple hours each day, Britt or Chase played games as part of an ongoing Let's Play. For the 7 days of the week, they usually played a different game each day. Then, the next week they picked up where they left off the previous week, thus making it a once a week Let's Play update. As of the end of the Metroid Marathon 2011, TheSpeedGamers stopped the 24/7 streams until further notice.

On Labor Day 2011, TheSpeedGamers once again started TSG 24/7. In the fall of 2011, TSG 24/7 became TSG Present!, a more occasional stream than the previous continuous efforts.

Notable Marathons
The Legend of Zelda Marathon I (March 14–17, 2008): This was TheSpeedGamers' first marathon, which lasted 72 hours. All the mainstream console Legend of Zelda games were played. They raised $1,090.00 for St. Jude Children's Research Hospital.
Pokémon Marathon 2009 (December 18–21, 2009): TheSpeedGamers played the Third and Fourth Generation Pokémon games (Excluding Emerald and Platinum) to catch all 493 Pokémon. They raised $18,395.96 for Ally's House.
Final Fantasy Marathon 2009 (July 17–24, 2009): TheSpeedGamers played a week-long marathon.  During this time, they played 12 Final Fantasy titles and raised over $50,000 for ACT Today!, a charity for autism. They were awarded the Guinness World Record for "Longest Relay of a Japanese RPG". At one point, the marathon had more than 19,000 simultaneous viewers thanks to advertisement on MMO-Champion.
Mario Marathon 2010 (June 11–19, 2010): TheSpeedGamers longest marathon.  They played over 30 Mario games and raised $57,000 for ACT Today, they originally were only going to play for a week, but extended the marathon for an extra day because of donations.  Thanks to a viewer embedding the stream on MMO-Champion, the views raised to over 30,000.  Prizes given away included a Nintendo Wii, posters, hats, etc.  At certain points, viewers who donated $100 could join a skype call with one of the commentators.
Star Wars Marathon (July 8–15, 2011): A week-long marathon, raised $11,254 for Direct Relief (short of the $30,000 goal).  At the conclusion of the marathon, announcements were made pushing the Zelda Marathon from the fall of 2011 to the Christmas marathon slot of 2011.  The Pokémon Marathon scheduled for that slot was pushed to be made 2012's week-long event, later scheduled to start June 15, 2012.
The Legend of Zelda Marathon 2011 (December 16–18, 2011, extended 24 hours to December 19, 2011, upon reaching their $15,000 goal): The charity for the marathon was The Rocking H Ranch (where this and a number of their previous marathons have been held).  Thanks to a renewed push by the group, the marathon reached its $15,000 goal before the end of the initial 72 hours and was extended an additional 24 hours, the extra time highlighted by 2011 Zelda release The Legend of Zelda: Skyward Sword.  On December 29, 2011, on TheSpeedGamers' Twitter account, it was announced that the final grand total for the marathon was $20,016.00.  Since the marathon reached its "new goal" of $20,000, as stated during the extension, TheSpeedGamers announced that their Christmas 2012 marathon would be a marathon of games within the Mario franchise.
Pokémon Marathon 2012 (June 15–22, 2012, 168 hours): The charity for the fourth-annual week-long marathon was ACT Today.   The renewed push after 2011's week-long marathon continued, as a series of cutthroat auctions for various donated artwork aided TheSpeedGamers to reach their highest donation total in history, over $59,000, beating the record set in 2010's week-long Mario Marathon.
Indiethon (April 25–28, 2014): TheSpeedGamers partnered with Humble Bundle in spring 2014 to raise money for Direct Relief, and a total of $122,607.88 was raised for the charity through the bundle.
Pokémon Sun & Moon Marathon (December 16–20, 2016): Weeks after the launch of Pokémon Sun & Moon on the Nintendo 3DS, TheSpeedGamers held a marathon with the goal of catching every Pokémon available in-game at the time, which was accomplished on the final day of the event. The marathon helped to raise money for buildOn, and the funds went toward the building of a school in Mali.
The Legend of Zelda: Breath of the Wild Marathon (March 3–6, 2017, 90 hours): To celebrate the launch of the Nintendo Switch, The Legend of Zelda: Breath of the Wild, and the 9-year anniversary of TheSpeedGamers, the group held its first launch marathon that began as soon as the game released in North America.
Ten-Year Anniversary The Legend of Zelda Marathon (March 9–13, 2018, 96 hours): In honor of the ten-year anniversary of TheSpeedGamers, a 96-hour marathon of The Legend of Zelda franchise was held for St. Jude Children's Research Hospital.

Marathon and Special Event List

*:  The Summer of Zelda, a month-long effort of nightly streams, was originally designed to raise money for ACT Today! through the Pepsi Refresh Project in place at the time.  The second weekend of the month, a user notified TheSpeedGamers that ACT Today! was also in the running with Chase Community Giving on Facebook, a similar project by Chase Bank.  With only three days to do it, the community was able to garner enough votes to gain the charity a $20,000 donation for placing in the top 200 charities at the event.
***: During a few months in mid-2014, there were several minithons which all aimed to raise money for ACT Today. About $3,000 was raised in total. Exact total still needs to be added.

References

External links

Culture of Arlington, Texas
Charities based in Texas
Speedrunning communities